Han history may refer to:

Book of Han, a history book by Pan Gu and his family
History of the Han dynasty

See also
Han (disambiguation)
Han dynasty
Book of Later Han